Gymnoscelis sara is a moth in the family Geometridae. It is found on Fiji, New Caledonia and Vanuatu.

Subspecies
Gymnoscelis sara sara
Gymnoscelis sara hamata Holloway, 1979

References

External links

Moths described in 1975
sara